Guido Bonatti  (died between 1296 and 1300) was an Italian mathematician, astronomer and astrologer, who was the most celebrated astrologer of the 13th century.
Bonatti was advisor of Frederick II, Holy Roman Emperor, Ezzelino da Romano III, Guido Novello da Polenta and Guido I da Montefeltro. He also served the communal governments of Florence, Siena and Forlì. His employers were all Ghibellines (supporters of the  Holy Roman Emperor), who were in conflict with the Guelphs (supporters of the Pope), and all were excommunicated at some time or another. Bonatti's astrological reputation was also criticised in Dante's Divine Comedy, where he is depicted as residing in hell as punishment for his astrology.

His most famous work was his Liber Astronomiae or 'Book of Astronomy', written around 1277. This remained a classic astrology textbook for two centuries.

Biography
Bonatti's dates of birth and death are unknown, the latter probably occurring between 1296 and 1300. In 1233 he is known as the winner of a dispute in Bologna with the friar Giovanni Schio from Vicenza, who maintained the non-scientific basis of astrology.

He is probably the first astrologer to have used the midpoints in astrology.  He used it to refine the timing for the military campaigns for the Count of Montefeltro Bonati announced to the count that he would repulse the enemy but would be wounded in the fray. The event transpired as Bonati had predicted, and the count, who had taken with him the necessary materials to staunch his wound in case the prophecy came true, became a devout adherent of astrology.

There is a tradition that Bonatti, towards the end of his life, took the friar's habit of  the Franciscan Order. This has been contested, as Bonatti expressed great disdain for Franciscans in his early period. However, the Franciscan Order, in the 1924 inaugural issue of its annual publication, Franciscan Studies, lays claim to Fra Guido Bonatti:

According to the uncorroborated account of the Italian historian Ludovico Antonio Muratori, Bonatti was murdered by robbers whilst returning from a study trip to Paris and other Italian cities, being set upon in or near Casena, with his body left upon the road. Evidence from various accounts establishes that Bonatti was in his eighties when he died.

References

External links
English translation of Bonatti's Liber Astronomiae
English translations of extracts from Liber Astronomiae: "Bonatti on War" and "Bonatti on Arabic Parts"
The Life of Guido Bonatti
"Anima astrologiae, Guido Bonatus by William Lilly, Student in Astrology" 
Guidonis Bonati De Astronomia tractatus (Latin)
Online Galleries, History of Science Collections, University of Oklahoma Libraries  High resolution images of works by Guido Bonatti in .jpg and .tiff format.

13th-century births
1290s deaths
People from Forlì
Italian astrological writers
Italian astrologers
13th-century astrologers
13th-century Italian mathematicians
13th-century Italian astronomers
Court of Frederick II, Holy Roman Emperor